Harry John Kavanagh (born 5 February 2002) is an English  footballer who plays for Gosport Borough  as  a right back.

Club career

Portsmouth
Kavanagh progressed through Pompey's youth categories after joining the club at the age of 6.

Kavanagh had spells on loan in non-league playing for Bognor Regis Town and Gosport Borough.  

Kavanagh made his Portsmouth debut in a 1–0 defeat vs West Ham United U21s on 10 November 2020 in the EFL Trophy.

On 12 January 2021, he made his second Portsmouth appearance, starting in a 5–1 defeat at Peterborough United in the EFL Trophy.

Gosport Borough

On 7 July 2021, Kavanagh signed for Gosport Borough.

On 14 August 2021, Kavanagh broke his collarbone during the first game of the season, putting him out of action for at least 6 weeks.

Career statistics

References

External links
Portsmouth FC profile

2002 births
Living people
Footballers from Portsmouth
English footballers
Portsmouth F.C. players
Association football defenders